La Movida Literaria  was a Colombian literary magazine created in 2004, it circulated and had its web site until 2010. From its beginnings as a blog included literary criticism, poetry,  fiction and non fiction, and later as a magazine was responsible for disseminating the emerging literature of Colombia in the 21st century with its five print editions (The last one came out in August 2009). The publication was awarded as the best web portal and best interview - to David Manzur - by the Colombian journalistic organization Andiarios. It was sold in bookshops and was distributed free of charge in universities. The magazine was sponsored by the Colombian authors Germán Espinosa and R. H. Moreno Durán. Many of the authors who published at the time in the magazine have been chosen for the two editions of Bogotá 39 and  also for selection of the 25 best kept secrets of Latin America literature, selection convened by the International Book Fair of Guadalajara in 2011. The magazine was a recognized as an independent magazine, which open the door for new literary voices and made various free literary events, particularly in Bogota. It also had a prize literary of short stories in 2009 which was obtained by the writer Ángel Unfried, the editor in chief El Malpensante magazine.

Members and contributors of La Movida Literaria
Alonso Quijano
Jesse Tagen Mills
David Roa Castaño
Carlos (Ios) Fernández Utica
Juan Pablo Plata
Sebastián Pineda Buitrago
Germám Espinosa
R.H. Moreno Durán

References

External links
La Movida Literaria at Cuadrivio
News of La Movida Literaria at newspaper Portafolio
La Movida Literaria 4. Blog at El Tiempo
 La Movida Literaria at Universa 
Pdf of print first magazine

2004 establishments in Colombia
2009 disestablishments in Colombia
Annual magazines
Defunct literary magazines
Defunct magazines published in Colombia
Magazines disestablished in 2009
Magazines established in 2004
Mass media in Bogotá
Spanish-language magazines